Kanyadan is a Hindu wedding ritual.

Kanyadan may also refer to:

Film
 Kanyadaan (1968 film), a Hindi social romantic drama film
 Kanyadaan (2002 film), an Indian Assamese-language family drama film
 Kanyadan (film), a 1965 Indian Maithili-language film
 Kanyaadaanam a 1976 Malayalam film
 Kanyadanam (1998 film), a 1998 Telugu film

TV series
 Kanyadaan (1999 TV series), a Hindi soap opera
 Kanyadaan (2020 TV series), a Bengali soap opera
 Kanyaadaana, a 2021 Kannada soap opera
 Kanyadanam (Telugu TV series), a 2021 Indian Telugu-language soap opera
 Kanyadanam (Malayalam TV series), a 2021 Indian Malayalam-language soap opera